The 2022–23 season is the 116th in the history of SV Waldhof Mannheim and their fourth consecutive season in the third division since 2021. The club will participate in 3. Liga and DFB-Pokal.

Players

Transfers

Pre-season and friendlies

Competitions

Overall record

3. Liga

League table

Results summary

Results by round

Matches 
The league fixtures were announced on 24 June 2022.

DFB-Pokal

References 

SV Waldhof Mannheim
Waldhof Mannheim